Anna Marrs (born 1974) is President of Global Commercial Services at American Express, responsible for the company's businesses devoted to serving small, mid-sized, large and global companies around the world.

Early life
Marrs has a bachelor's degree from Chicago's Northwestern University, and an MBA from London Business School.

Career
Marrs' first job was with D. E. Shaw, a New York-based investment firm. She went on to become a partner in the banking practice of McKinsey & Company, and the CEO of a London-based financial information company.

In 2012, Marrs joined Standard Chartered as group head of strategy and corporate development. She was also Standard Chartered's CEO of Commercial and Private Banking and Regional CEO for ASEAN and South Asia until mid 2018. Marrs joined American Express as President of Global Commercial Services in September 2018.

References

1974 births
Living people